Nelia Martins (born July 9, 1998) is an East Timorese middle-distance runner. She competed at the 2016 Summer Olympics in the women's 1500 metres race; her time of 5:00.53 in the heats did not qualify her for the semifinals.

References

External links
 

1998 births
Living people
People from Dili
East Timorese female middle-distance runners
Olympic athletes of East Timor
Athletes (track and field) at the 2016 Summer Olympics
Athletes (track and field) at the 2014 Summer Youth Olympics